This is a list of Cypriot football transfers for the 2008–09 summer transfer window by club. Only transfers of clubs in the Cypriot First Division are included.

The summer transfer window opened on 1 June 2008, although a few transfers took place prior to that date. The window closed at midnight on 31 August 2008. Players without a club may join one at any time, either during or in between transfer windows.

Marfin Laiki League

AEK Larnaca

In:

Out:

AEL Limassol

In:

Out:

AEP Paphos

In:

Out:

Alki Larnaca

In:

Out:

Anorthosis Famagusta

In:

Out:

APEP Pitsilia

In:

Out:

APOEL

In:

Out:

Apollon Limassol

In:

 

Out:

APOP Kinyras Peyias

In:

Out:

Atromitos Yeroskipou

In:

Out:

Doxa Katokopia

In:

Out:

Enosis Neon Paralimni

In:

Out:

Ethnikos Achna

In:

Out:

Omonia

In:

Out:

See also
List of Belgian football transfers summer 2008
List of Danish football transfers summer 2008
List of Dutch football transfers summer 2008
List of English football transfers summer 2008
List of German football transfers summer 2008
List of Greek football transfers 2008-09
List of Maltese football transfers summer 2008
List of Italian football transfers summer 2008 (July)
List of Italian football transfers summer 2008 (August)
List of Scottish football transfers 2008-09
List of Spanish football transfers summer 2008
List of Turkish football transfers 2008-09

References

Cypriot
Transfers Summer 2008
2008